Kocho may refer to:

 Kōchō (弘長), a Japanese era name 
 Kocho (Iraq), Yazidi village in northern Iraq
 Kocho (food), a staple food in Ethiopia